The armed forces of many nations have, at one time or another, used foreign volunteers who are motivated by political, ideological or other considerations to join a foreign army. These may be formed into units of a given nationality or may be formed into mixed nationality foreign units. Sometimes foreign volunteers were or are incorporated into ordinary units.  The practice has a long history, dating back at least as far as the Roman Empire, which recruited non-citizens into Auxiliary units on the promise of them receiving Roman citizenship for themselves and their descendants at the end of their service.

Mixed nationality units

Historic
60th (Royal American) Regiment of Foot. Composed of 'foreign Protestants'.
Boer foreign volunteers
Hohenlohe Regiment of France during the Bourbon Restoration.
International Brigades of the Spanish Civil War
Islamic Legion
Kenpeitai Auxiliary units consisted of regional ethnic forces that were organized in areas occupied by the Japanese.
King's African Rifles
The SS (particularly the Waffen-SS) made extensive use of foreigners during World War II. For more information, see: Waffen-SS foreign volunteers and conscripts
Rhodesian Light Infantry (initially all-Rhodesian, this unit became the "Foreign Legion" of the Rhodesian Army)
Mahal – non-Israeli volunteers who fought for Israel in the 1948 Arab–Israeli War. There is to this day a voluntary program called Mahal in the Israeli army.
Afghan mujahideen

Current

Also including nationals
Tercio de Extranjeros, or Tercio, or Spanish Legion - prior to 1987 and in the 2000s, after the abandonment of conscription, the Spanish Army is again accepting foreigners from select nationalities. The Legion today accepts male and female native Spanish speakers, mostly from Central American and South American states. Recruits are required to have a valid Spanish residence permit.

Only including foreigners
French Foreign Legion - Officer corps predominantly French
International Freedom Battalion – An armed group of leftist foreign volunteers that fight in support of the Rojava Revolution in Syria.
Ukraine has requested for foreign volunteers to join the International Legion of Territorial Defense of Ukraine to help defend the country from the 2022 Russian invasion.

Units by nationality

American
During both world wars, American volunteers served on the allied side before the US joined the war.  During World War I, there were even a few Americans who volunteered to fly for the Imperial German Flying Corps.
The Lafayette Escadrille in the French Air Force, World War I
A number of American pilots flew with No. 32 Squadron RAF during World War I
The 7th Air Escadrille (also known as the Kościuszko Squadron) in the Polish Air Force, Polish-Soviet War
The Lincoln Brigade on the Republican side of the Spanish Civil War
The Eagle Squadrons in the Royal Air Force, World War II
The Flying Tigers in the Republic of China Air Force, World War II
Before the US entered the war, many Americans joined the Canadian Forces, especially the RCAF, and served in ordinary Canadian units.
Rachel Cox in Into the Dust and Fire records the history of five Ivy Leaguers (Chuck Bolte, Jack Brister, Bill Durkee, Heyward Cutting, and Robert Cox) who enlisted in the British Army and became the first Americans to fight the Nazis
The Crippled Eagles – American volunteers in Rhodesia (1965–1979)

Bangladeshi 

 8,000 young men from Bangladesh volunteered to enlist in the PLO in 1987

Belgian
Units from modern-day Belgium (then the Austrian Netherlands or United Kingdom of the Netherlands) served in the French armies of both the French Revolutionary and Napoleonic Wars
The Belgian Legion during the Franco-Mexican War of 1864-6
The 6 Février Battalion, part of the International Brigades during the Spanish Civil War was made up of French and Belgians. Their citizenship rights were revoked as a result of their decision to serve in a foreign army.
Two Belgian units fought in the Waffen SS during the Second World War

British
During the Peninsular War, many Britons joined Spanish regular and irregular forces. 
The state-sponsored Auxiliary Legion of the First Carlist War.
The British Legions in the South American Wars of Independence during the 19th century.
The British Free Corps of the Waffen SS in World War II.
2,500 British fought in the Spanish civil war on the side of the republicans.
In the Paraguay Revolution of 1922, British pilots fought in the  Escuela de Aviación Militar.
Many Britons fought during the American Civil War for both the United States and Confederate States. 67 British soldiers in the Union Army received the Medal of Honor.
Dozens of British volunteers joined Croatian units and fought in the Yugoslav Wars between 1991 and 1995, most of them on the King Tomislav Brigade.
Hundreds of British Nationals served in the Rhodesian Security Forces during the Rhodesian Bush War in the 1970s.

Bulgarian 

 Bulgarian Volunteer Corps. Fought for the Russian Empire during the Russo-Turkish War of 1877-1878.

Chinese

The Chinese People's Volunteer Army that fought in the Korean War was nominally composed of volunteers sent by the People's Republic of China even though it was in fact composed of regular troops of the People's Liberation Army.

Croatian

The 13th Waffen Mountain Division of the SS Handschar, fought in World War II on the Axis' side
The 23rd Waffen Mountain Division of the SS Kama, fought in World War II on the Axis' side
The 369th (Croatian) Reinforced Infantry Regiment as part of German Wehrmacht, fought in World War II
The 369th (Croatian) Infantry Division, as part of German Wehrmacht, fought in World War II
The 373rd (Croatian) Infantry Division, as part of German Wehrmacht, fought in World War II
The 392nd (Croatian) Infantry Division, as part of German Wehrmacht, fought in World War II
The Croatian Air Force Legion, as part of German Luftwaffe fought in World War II on the Axis' side
The Croatian Anti-Aircraft Legion, as part of German Luftwaffe fought in World War II on the Axis' side
The Croatian Naval Legion, as part of the German Kriegsmarine, fought in World War II on the Black Sea

Czech 

 the Czechoslovak Legion, which fought on various fronts of WW1, as well as the Russian Civil War. 
 1st Czechoslovak Army Corps in the Soviet Union.

Estonian
In 1944, some 2,000 Estonians served in the Finnish Infantry Regiment 200 during the Continuation War.

Filipino
In the 1770s, the Spanish colonial army in the Philippines had an Infantry Company of Cavite Malabars
Filipinos served in the French military during the Cochinchina Campaign.
Filipinos served in the Ever Victorious Army.
The Philippine Revolutionary Army included commissioned officers who were American, Chinese, Cuban, English, Italian, Japanese, and Spanish.
The Philippine Constabulary in its early years had commissioned officers from Belgium, Cuba, England, France, Germany, Ireland, Italy, the Philippines, Poland, Puerto Rico, Scotland, Spain, Sweden, and Turkey.
Twenty-four Filipinos served in the French Army during World War I.
Filipinos fought on both sides of the Spanish Civil War.
During the Pacific War, Filipinos served in various pro-Japanese militias:
The Bisigbakal ñg Tagala (Tagalog "Iron Arm of Tagala") was formed in January 1945 to assist the Japanese in maintaining peace and order   in Manila.  The Bisig Bakal received weapons, uniforms, and training from the Japanese.
About five thousand Filipinos served in a militia called the Makapili, which was under Japanese command. The unit was formed on 10 November 1944 and was issued around two thousand rifles by the Japanese.  Its headquarters was located at the Christ the King compound in Quezon City.  The organization was active in the Manila area, and in the nearby provinces of Rizal, Laguna, Bulacan, and Nueva Ecija.  This militia made its last stand at Marikina in 1945.  Other militias similar to the Makapili were:  the Borong-Borong Gang, Kaigun Hatai, and Nishimura Butai.
The Pambansang Pag-asa ng mga Anak ni Rizal (Tagalog "National Hope of the Children of Rizal") consisted of Ganáps in Pililla, Rizal, who were organized into a semi-military unit with the assistance of the Japanese.  Also known as Pampar, they wore blue denim uniforms with short pants and were drilled along Japanese military lines.  They performed sentry duties for the Japanese, and functioned as auxiliary troops of the Japanese army.  They independently conducted raids against guerrilla camps.
The Yoin, incorrectly known as U.N. or United Nippon, were members of the Japanese Auxiliary Army drawn from the ranks of the Ganáp Party.  They were trained for military purposes and wore Japanese regular uniforms.  They were used as replacements in the ranks of Japanese infantry.  Their counterparts in the Japanese Empire were the Koreans, Formosans, and Manchuokuans pressed into the Japanese army.
Filipinos, recruited by the Moro Islamic Liberation Front, fought in the Soviet–Afghan War.
Filipinos fought in the Syrian Civil War.
Forty foreign fighters, from Indonesia, Malaysia, Yemen, and Chechnya, fought in the Siege of Marawi.

Finnish

As part of the Jäger Movement, the Finnish battalion was formed and served under German Empire against the Russian Empire. 
1,408 Finns volunteered to serve in the 5th SS Panzer Division Wiking, against the USSR.

French
Foreign Legion - A wing of the French Army which recruits foreign nationals.
9,000 French fought in the International Brigades during the Spanish Civil War in the side of the Republicans. some also fought for the Nationalists
Some French emigres who fled to Britain fought in the British Army of the Napoleonic Wars.
Charlemagne Regiment of the SS fought for Germany in the Second World War.
Chasseurs Britanniques of the Napoleonic Wars.
Legion of French Volunteers Against Bolshevism a collaborationist force of French who fought Soviet partisans for Nazi Germany.
 From 1991 to 1994, during the Croatian War of Independence and the Bosnian War, a number of French volunteers fought alongside the Croats in the King Tomislav Brigade.
7 Independent Company (Rhodesia).

German
King's German Legion in the Napoleonic Wars.
 In the Spanish Civil War, the state-sponsored Condor Legion fought for the Nationalists, while the Thaelmann Battalion fought for the Republicans.
During the American Civil War Germany was the place of birth for thousands of Union soldiers. Several German speaking regiments existed such as the 9th Ohio Infantry, or the 74th Pennsylvania Infantry.
 From 1991 to 1994, during the Croatian War of Independence and the Bosnian War, a number of former Bundeswehr and East-German army members fought along the Croats in the King Tomislav Brigade. The brigade's executive officer at the time of the outbreak of the Bosnian Croat War was former Bundeswehr officer Jürgen Schmidt, who died while leading his troops against Bosnian Muslim forces near Gornji Vakuf, in January 1993. In another action, a German-volunteer patrol, led by former Bundeswehr member Michael Homeister, ambushed and killed two Serbs manning an observation post.

Greek
The Greek Battalion of Balaklava participated in the Russo-Turkish wars of 1768–1774, 1787–1792 and 1806–1812 on the side of the Russian Empire.
The Greek Volunteer Guard, fought in the Bosnian War on the side of the Army of Republika Srpska.
The Greek Volunteer Legion, fought in the Crimean War on the side of the Russian Empire.

Indian 
 The Free Indian Legion was a volunteer legion made up of Indian POWs. The legion was first part of the Wehrmacht but transferred to the Waffen-SS late in the war.
 Battaglione Azad Hindoustan.

Irish
See also Irish military diaspora.
The Irish Brigade in the French Army from 1690 and through the eighteenth century.
The Irish Legion fought for Imperial France during the Napoleonic Wars
 1st Regiment Venezuelan Rifles – Irish regiment that was part of the British Legions fighting in the South American Wars of Independence took part in the Venezuelan War of Independence.
St. Patrick's Battalion in the Mexican Army during the Mexican–American War.
The Irish Brigade which served on the Union side in the American Civil War in the 1860s
Irish commandos in the Boer Army during the Boer War
Connolly Column, fought for the Spanish republic in the Spanish civil war.
The Irish Brigade which fought for the Nationalist rebels in the Spanish Civil War
Irish Papal Battalion fought for the Papal States prior to Italian Unification.
Irish Regiment of Canada fought in WW1 and WW2 for Canada along with the Irish Fusillers (Canadian).
South African Irish Regiment fought for the Union of South Africa both in WW1 and WW2 and was later transformed to a reserve unit which still forms part of the modern Republic of South African Army.

Israeli
Mahal – Program for non-Israelis between the age of 18–24 to serve in the IDF.

Italian
The Redshirts of Giuseppe Garibaldi fought in Southern Italy and Uruguay.
Corpo Truppe Volontarie in the Spanish Civil War.
Division Garibaldi fought under Josip Broz Tito's command as a part of NOVJ in Dalmatia and Bosnia, during the Second World War

Japanese 

 Former Japanese Soldiers fought alongside the Viet Minh.

Moroccan
Fuerzas Regulares Indígenas in the 1934 Asturian uprising and the Spanish Civil War.

Nepalese
Gurkhas in the British Army.
Gorkhas in the Indian Army.
Gurkha Contingent in the Singapore Police Force
Gurkha Reserve Unit – a similar type force in Brunei.
Foreign Legion in the French Army.

Polish
Brigades in the Spanish Civil War.
Polish Lancers and other Polish forces in the Army of Napoleon.
 Polish Volunteers in many wars and revolutions of the 19th century, including Spring of Nations, Crimean War (on Turkish side) and The Paris Commune.
The Blue Army, fought on the French side in WW1.
The Polish Legions, fought for the Central Powers.
Polish Volunteers served in the RAF during WW2.

Portuguese
Legião Viriato in the Spanish Civil War.

Rhodesian
There were hundreds of foreign volunteers in the Rhodesian Security Forces during the Rhodesian Bush War. The Rhodesian Army accepted foreign volunteers, almost all of whom were required to speak English, as they were integrated into regular units (usually the Rhodesian Light Infantry) alongside locally based soldiers. The exception was 7 Independent Company, a short-lived unit made up entirely of French-speaking personnel, led by francophone officers, which existed between 1977 and 1978.

Russian
The Armed Forces of the Russian Federation have since 2010 or so begun to recruit CIS volunteers. See Armed Forces of the Russian Federation#Personnel.
A number of Russian soldiers would fight for Ukraine during the Russo-Ukrainian War as part of the Freedom of Russia Legion.
Soviet Volunteer Group, between 1927-1941 as part of the Republic of China Air Force during the Second Sino-Japanese War.
Some Russians fought for the Allies on the Western Front of WW1 as part of the Russian Legion. They were former members of the Russian Expeditionary Force.
A small group of White Russian emigres fought for Nationalist Spain as part of the Spanish Legion. 
Asano Brigade, a unit of White Russian Emigres in Manchukuo.
Various Russian collaborators, nicknamed Hiwis fought in both the Wehrmacht and the Waffen SS.
Russian Emigres served in the Shanghai Volunteer Corps, a multinational volunteer force of the Shanghai International Settlement.

Serbian

The Serb Volunteer Guard, Fought in the Croatian War of Independence and the Bosnian War supporting the Serb forces like the Army of Republika Srpska.
The Serbian Volunteer Corps was an Axis collaborationist group during WWII that helped fight against partisan forces in Serbia.

Scottish
Scots have a long history of service in the armies of Kings of France since at least the ninth century. The Scottish Guard was formally created by the French King Charles VII in 1422, and existed until the end of the Bourbon Restoration period in 1830.

South African
South African 32 Battalion

Spanish
The Blue Division of World War II fighting with Germany against the USSR.
The Blue Legion was formed late in the Second World War out of Blue Division soldiers who refused to leave after Franco required all Spaniards to leave Axis forces.
The 9th Armoured Company of the Free French Forces.
 The Spanish Legion accepts foreign recruits.

Swedish
Swedish Voluntary Air Force fighting for the Finnish side in the Winter War
Swedish Volunteer Corps fighting for the Finnish side in the Winter War
Hundreds of Swedes volunteered in the 5th SS Panzer Division Wiking to fight against the USSR.
1,600 Swedes fought for the anti-communist side of the Finnish Civil War.
Swedish volunteers took part in the Estonian War of Independence

Swiss
Pontifical Swiss Guard
Swiss mercenaries served under the flags of many European nations including the British, Dutch, French and Spanish; as well as continue to serve as the military of the Holy See.

Taiwanese
Takasago Volunteers were volunteer soldiers in the Imperial Japanese Army recruited from the Taiwanese aboriginal tribes during World War II.

Ukrainian 
 The 14th Waffen Grenadier Division of the SS (1st Galician) was made up nearly entirely of ethnic Ukrainians.
 The Ukrainian Liberation Army was a division of the Wehrmacht that fought all over Europe. 
 The Nachtigall Battalion was a battalion of the Wehrmacht made up of Ukrainian nationalists who fought against the USSR.
 The Roland Battalion was a battalion of the Wehrmacht made up of Ukrainian nationalists who fought against the USSR.
 The Roland and Nachtigall battalions were later reorganized into the 201st Schutzmannschaft.
 The Ukrainian National Army fought against the USSR in the last days of WWII.
 Thousands of Hiwis were of Ukrainian origin.
 Foreign volunteers joined the International Legion of Territorial Defense of Ukraine to defend Ukraine from the Russian Invasion in 2022.

Yugoslav
 Yugoslav brigadistas, a contingent from the Kingdom of Yugoslavia who fought beside the Republican faction (In support of the government of the Second Spanish Republic).
 The 1st Yugoslav Volunteer Brigade, fought in World War II under Red Army command. Later became part of the Yugoslav Army.

See also
 List of militaries that recruit foreigners
 Europäische Freiwillige of the Second World War
 Foreign legions
 Foreign fighter
 Mercenary
 Military volunteer
 Mujahideen
 Spanish Civil War and Foreign Involvement
 Foreign support in the Winter War
 White Tights, alleged Baltic female snipers in Chechnya

References 

Lists of military personnel